This was the tenth season for rugby league's League Cup competition. It was again known as the John Player Trophy for sponsorship purposes.

Warrington won the final, beating Barrow by the score of 12-5 at Central Park, Wigan in front of a crowd of 12,802. The gate receipts were £21020.

Background 
This season saw only one change in the  entrants, with the  admittance of Fulham to the  league and to this competition, resulted in only one junior club being invited, the total number remaining at thirty-two.

Competition and results

Round 1 - First  Round 

Involved  16 matches and 32 Clubs

Round 2 - Second  Round 

Involved  8 matches and 16 Clubs

Round 3 -Quarter Finals 

Involved 4 matches with 8 clubs

Round 4 – Semi-Finals 

Involved 2 matches and 4 Clubs

Round 3 – Semi-Finals - Replays  
Involved 1 match and 2 Clubs

Final

Teams

Prize money 
As part of the sponsorship deal and funds, the  prize money awarded to the competing teams for this season is as follows:

The road to success 
This tree excludes any preliminary round fixtures

Notes and comments 
1 * Pilkington Recs are a Junior (amateur) club from St Helens, home ground was City Road until they moved to Ruskin Drive from 2011-12
2 * Wigan official archives gives the score as 15-34 but RUGBYLEAGUEproject gives it as 16-34
3 * RUGBYLEAGUEproject gives the attendance as 3,571, the same as the previously listed match (which was Widnes v Huddersfield in round 2), but the Widnes official website omits to give the attendance for this match, one of only a few matches for that season without an attendance noted
4 * Wigan official archives give the score as 13-10 but RUGBYLEAGUEproject gives it as 13-15. As Barrow progressed into the semi-final, the score given in the Wigan archives was obviously in error
5 * RUGBYLEAGUEproject gives the attendance as 12,820 but Rothman's Yearbooks 1990-91 and 1992-93 give it as 12,802
6 * The attendance was a record for the final of this tournament (but would be broken next season)
7  * Central Park was the home ground of Wigan with a final capacity of 18,000, although the record attendance was  47,747 for Wigan v St Helens 27 March 1959

See also 
1980–81 Rugby Football League season
1980 Lancashire Cup
1980 Yorkshire Cup
Player's No.6 Trophy
Rugby league county cups

References
General
 

Specific

External links
Saints Heritage Society
1896–97 Northern Rugby Football Union season at wigan.rlfans.com 
Hull&Proud Fixtures & Results 1896/1897
Widnes Vikings - One team, one passion Season In Review - 1896-97
The Northern Union at warringtonwolves.org
Huddersfield R L Heritage
Wakefield until I die

1980 in English rugby league
1981 in English rugby league
League Cup (rugby league)